Ginásio Clube Vilacondense is a Volleyball team based in Vila do Conde, Portugal. It plays in Portuguese Volleyball League A1 and a Portuguese karaté champions team.

Achievements
 Portuguese sport clube: 1 (2001/02)

Portuguese volleyball teams